Shakesville may refer to:

Fort Stikine, Alaska
Shakesville.com, an American blog operational from 2004 to 2019; see A Room of One's Own